Achille Millien (4 September 1838 – 12 January 1927) was a French poet and folklorist.

His poetic work includes a dozen collections of rustic inspiration: La Moisson, Chants agrestes, Musettes et clairons, Chez nous, Aux champs et au foyer, L'Heure du couvre-feu...

Biography 
As soon as 1877, Millien began the systematic collection of folk tales, legends and folk songs of the Nivernais region. This considerable work, the results of which are still largely unpublished, makes Achille Millien "an exemplary reference in the world of contemporary ethnology".

In 1896, he established the Revue du Nivernais, a monthly publication which appeared until 1910.

Works 
1860: La Moisson, Paris, C. Vanier, 302 p.
1862: Chants agrestes, Paris, E. Dentu, 298 p.
1862: La Leçon rustique, Nevers, I.-M. Fay, 7 p.
1863–1864: Les Poèmes de la nuit. humoristiques, Paris, E. Dentu, 183 p.
1865–1867: Musettes et clairons, Paris, J. Tardieu, 136 p.
1870: Légendes d’aujourd’hui, poèmes suivis de lieds et sonnets, Paris, Garnier, 228 p.
1874: Voix des ruines. Légendes évangéliques. Paysages d’hiver, Paris, Alphonse  Lemerre, 174 p.
1875: Nouvelles poésies (1864–1873), Paris, Alphonse  Lemerre, VIII-404 p.
1877: Premières poésies (1859–1863), Paris, Alphonse Lemerre, 392 p.
1879: Poèmes et sonnets, Paris, Alphonse Lemerre, 172 p.
1891: Chants populaires de la Grèce, de la Serbie et du Monténégro, Paris, Alphonse Lemerre, 184 p.
1892–1893: Fleurs de poésie : poètes portugais, morceaux des poètes étrangers contemporains traduits en vers par Alphonse Millien, Nevers, G. Vallière, 16 p.
1893: Les chants oraux du peuple russe, Paris, H. Champion, 255 p.
1894: Ballades et chansons populaires tchèques et bulgares, Paris, Alphonse Lemerre, 121 p.
1894: Petits contes du Nivernais, Nevers, G. Vallière, 12 p.
1895–1896: Étrennes nivernaises, Nevers, G. Vallière.
1896: Chez nous, Paris, Alphonse Lemerre, 212 p.
1900: Aux champs et au foyer. Plein air. Intérieur. Rêves et souvenirs... , Paris, Alphonse Lemerre, 176 p.
1904: Le Parnasse du XIX: poètes néerlandais, hollandais et flamands, Paris, Alphonse Lemerre.
1906-1910: Chants et chansons populaires, Paris, E. Leroux, in 2 books and 3 volumes:
Book I (1906): Complaintes. Chants historiques (1 volume)
Book II (1908 and 1910): Chansons anecdotiques (2 volumes)
1910: L’Heure du couvre-feu. Genêts et bruyères. En Morvan. Chants de Noël. Ballades noires et chansons roses. Épaves, Paris, Alphonse Lemerre, 292 p.
1913: Choix de poésies, édition populaire, Nevers, T. Ropiteau, 56 p.
1915: Sous l’étoile. Petits poèmes de guerre, Nevers, T. Ropiteau.
1924: Roses de Noël. Derniers chants (1916-1924), Paris, Alphonse Lemerre, 142 p.

Distinctions 
 Chevalier of the Légion d'honneur by decree taken on 24 February 1921.

Bibliography 
 Léon Rogier, Les Poètes contemporains : Achille Millien, 1860, Paris, Vanier
 Clément Dubourg, Chez Achille Millien. Notes intimes pour servir à la bio-bibliographie du poète, 1900, Nevers, G. Vallière
 Marius Gerin, Anthologie du poète nivernais Achille Millien, 1924, Nevers/Paris, Fortin, 268 p.
 Maurice Mignon, Achille Millien. Poèmes choisis, 1924, Aix-en-Provence, éd. De la Revue Le Feu, 112 p.
 Paul Delarue, Renseignements divers sur la correspondance et les manuscrits d’Achille Millien in Mémoires de la Société académique du Nivernais, (pp. 123–129)
 Bernard Guineau, Chez nous, en terre nivernaise.., 1981, preface of the exhibition organised by les Amis de La Charité-sur-Loire.
 Charles Gardette, Achille Millien, folkloriste européen in Mémoires de la Société académique du Nivernais, 1983, No 65, (pp. 95–105)
 , Contes et chansons populaires du Nivernais-Morvan, 1993, Nevers, exhibition brochure
 Jean-François Counillon, Achille Millien, du poète de chez nous au chasseur de légendes in Bulletin de la Société nivernaise, 1998, No 47, (pp. 157–180)
 Françoise Morvan, Achille Millien : Contes de Bourgogne, Éditions Ouest-France, Rennes, 2008 (edition of the tales published by Achille Millien during his lifetime)
 Alain Jolivet, Rimes et Reflets du Nivernais : Regards d'Achille Millien, Éditions de l'Armançon, 2010, 237 p.
 Achille Millien, Jacques Branchu (éd.) Contes inédits du Nivernais et du Morvan, Éditions José Corti, Paris, 2015 "Collection Merveilleux", Preface by Nicole Belmont. Postface by Jacques Branchu (Edition and classification by Jacques Branchu of a selection of unpublished folk tales, extracted from the totality of the archives concerning the tales collected by Achille Millien, classified and commented by J. Branchu).

Filmography 
 Daniel Hénard and Jacques Tréfouël, Achille Millien : Passeur de mémoire, France 3 Bourgogne Franche-Comté and "Les films du lieu-dit", 2005, DVD de 160 min + livre de 150 p.

Discography 
 Harmonia Mundi, Le Pommier doux: Chansons traditionnelles de Nivernais Centre-France (with arrangements by Alain Gibert, Frédéric Paris, Évelyne Girardon, Trio Achille), Fédération des Associations de Musiques et Danses Traditionnelles (FAMDT), 2001

References

External links 
 Achille Millien (1838-1927). Biographie on Berose
 Achille MILLIEN(1838 - 1927) on La voix des Amognes
 Achille Millien (1838-1927), Une entreprise folkloriste en Nivernais on Sorbonne. Thèses 
 Fiche bio-bibliographique on www.garae.fr
 Archives départementales de la Nièvre dossier Achille Millien
 Achille Millien

19th-century French poets
20th-century French poets
Folklorists
Folk-song collectors
1838 births
1927 deaths
People from Nièvre
Chevaliers of the Légion d'honneur